Van Assche is a Dutch surname meaning "from Asse". Notable people with the surname include:

Henri Van Assche, Belgian painter
Kris Van Assche (born 1976), Belgian fashion designer
Luca Van Assche (born 2004), French tennis player

Dutch-language surnames
Surnames of Dutch origin